Spring Glen is the name of several places in the United States of America.

Spring Glen, Hamden, a neighborhood in the town of Hamden, Connecticut
Spring Glen, New York, a hamlet
Spring Glen, Pennsylvania, an unincorporated community
Spring Glen, Utah, a census-designated place
Spring Glen, Washington, an unincorporated community